The Cars Unlocked: The Live Performances is a 2006 live album and video of American new wave band the Cars released by Warner Music in 2006. The album has received mixed reviews due to the mixed quality of the source material.

Reception
Greg Prato of AllMusic gave the album a positive review, with the editorial staff awarding it four out of five stars. Prato praises the diversity of the video choices while criticizing some of the quality of the recordings, summing up that it is "a most welcome addition to the Cars' discography". At DVD Talk Jon Sinnott recommended "skip it" due to poor audio and video, although he praised some of the performances. For PopMatters, Adam Besenyodi echoes the sentiments that the actual audio-video quality is low but it serves as a valuable document of the band, with songs ranging from "good" to "unwatcheable"; he recommends that the CD edition "shouldn't be skipped".

Track listing
All songs written by Ric Ocasek, except where noted.

DVD
Intro
"My Best Friend's Girl"
"I'm in Touch with Your World"
"Let's Go"
"The Hotel"
"Gimme Some Slack"
Tokyo Sound Check
"Up and Down"
"Just What I Needed"
"Dr. G"
"Don't Cha Stop"
"Moving in Stereo" (Greg Hawkes, Ocasek)
"Through to You"
"Candy-O"
"You Might Think"
"Drive"
"Night Spots"
Sound Check
"Tonight She Comes"
"Magic"
"Shake It Up"
"Good Times Roll"
Bonus Material
"Cruiser"
"Strap Me In"
"Drive"
"Touch and Go"
"Everything You Say"

CD
"Magic" – 4:28
"Let's Go" – 3:42
"Touch and Go" – 4:59
"Drive" – 3:54
"My Best Friend's Girl" – 3:39
"Tonight She Comes" – 3:51
"Moving in Stereo" (Hawkes, Ocasek) –4:25
"You Might Think" – 3:15
"Just What I Needed" – 3:27
"Good Times Roll" – 3:34
"Hello Again" – 3:58
"Double Trouble" – 4:11
"Night Spots" – 3:31
"Heartbeat City" – 5:26

Personnel
The Cars
Elliot Easton – lead guitar, backing vocals
Greg Hawkes – keyboards, guitars, backing vocals
Ric Ocasek – lead and backing vocals, rhythm guitar, keyboards
Benjamin Orr – bass guitar, backing and lead vocals
David Robinson – drums, percussion, backing vocals

References

External links

2006 video albums
2006 live albums
Warner Music Vision live albums
Warner Music Vision video albums
Live video albums
The Cars live albums
The Cars video albums